Tentaoculus is a genus of sea snails, deep-sea false limpets, marine gastropod mollusks in the family Pseudococculinidae.

Species
Species within the genus Tentaoculus include:
 Tentaoculus balantiophaga B.A. Marshall, 1996
 Tentaoculus eritmetus (A. E. Verrill, 1884)
 Tentaoculus georgianus (Dall, 1927)
 Tentaoculus granulatus Warén & Bouchet, 2009
 Tentaoculus haptricola B.A. Marshall, 1986
 Tentaoculus lithodicola B.A. Marshall, 1986
 Tentaoculus neolithodicola B.A. Marshall, 1986
 Tentaoculus perlucidus Moskalev, 1976

References

 Moskalev, L. I. (1976). On the generic classification in Cocculinidae (Gastropoda, Prosobranchia). Trudy Instituta Okeanologii Imeni P.P. Shirshova 99: 59-70.
 Marshall B.A. (1986 ["1985"]) Recent and Tertiary Cocculinidae and Pseudococculinidae (Mollusca: Gastropoda) from New Zealand and New South Wales. New Zealand Journal of Zoology 12: 505-546.

External links

Pseudococculinidae